The 21st Council of Ministers for the state of West Bengal was formed under the leadership of Mamata Banerjee. She was sworn in as Chief Minister of West Bengal for the third time on 5 May 2021. The remaining council of ministers was sworn in on 10 May 2021.

Constitutional requirement

For the Council of Ministers to aid and advise Governor 
According to Article 163 of the Indian Constitution,

This means that the Ministers serve under the pleasure of the Governor and he/she may remove them, on the advice of the Chief Minister, whenever they want.

For other provisions as to Ministers 
According to Article 164 of the Indian Constitution,

Chief Minister & Cabinet Ministers

District Wise

Former Ministers

Notes

References

Trinamool Congress
Mamata Banerjee
West Bengal ministries
Lists of current Indian state and territorial ministries
Banerjee
2021 West Bengal Legislative Assembly election
3